R. Jose ben Zimra (or R. Jose b. Zimra; Hebrew: רבי יוסי בן זמרה) was Jewish rabbi of the 2nd-3rd centuries (sixth generation of tannaim), who lived during the transition period between the eras of the tannaim and the amoraim.

He was a kohen. He came from a privileged background family and his son married Judah haNasi's daughter. According to some, he was a descendant of King David.

Most of his teachings deal with the aggadah, and most of them were delivered by his student Eleazar ben Pedat, in Jose's name.

He spoke frequently against the sin of lashon hara.

The moshav Kerem Ben Zimra is named after him, due to a tradition that he was buried in that area.

References

Mishnah rabbis